Richard H. Frey (December 17, 1929 – April 25, 2020) was a former American football end who played for the Dallas Texans and Houston Oilers. He played college football at Texas A&M University, having previously attended Mark Keppel High School.  He died in April 2020.

References

1929 births
2020 deaths
American football defensive ends
Texas A&M Aggies football players
Dallas Texans (AFL) players
Houston Oilers players
Players of American football from New Jersey
People from Englewood, New Jersey
American Football League players